Oreodera mageia is a species of beetle in the family Cerambycidae. It was described by Martins, Galileo and Tavakilian in 2008.

References

Oreodera
Beetles described in 2008